The Men's Giant Slalom in the 2022 FIS Alpine Skiing World Cup consisted of eight events including the final. At the halfway point of the season (five events), Marco Odermatt of Switzerland had opened a commanding lead in the discipline by winning four of the races and finishing second in the other. The remainder of the season was held in March, after the 2022 Winter Olympics, but in the first post-Olympic event, Odermatt clinched the crystal globe for the season championship.

As discussed above, the season was interrupted by the 2022 Winter Olympics in Beijing, China (at the Yanqing National Alpine Skiing Centre in Yanqing District) from 6–19 February 2022.  The men's giant slalom was held at the "Ice River" course on 13 February 2022.

The World Cup final was held on Saturday, 19 March in the linked resorts of Courchevel and Méribel, France, which are located in Les Trois Vallées, on the Roc de Fer course at Méribel. Only the top 25 skiers in the World Cup downhill discipline and the winner of the Junior World Championship, plus athletes who have scored at least 500 points in the World Cup overall classification for the season, are eligible to compete in the final, and only the top 15 earn World Cup points.

Standings 

DNS = Did Not Start
DNQ = Did Not Qualify for run 2
DNF1 = Did Not Finish run 1
DSQ1 = Disqualified run 1
DNF2 = Did Not Finish run 2
DSQ2 = Disqualified run 2
NE = Not Eligible for finals
Updated at 19 March 2022 after all events.

See also
 2022 Alpine Skiing World Cup – Men's summary rankings
 2022 Alpine Skiing World Cup – Men's Overall
 2022 Alpine Skiing World Cup – Men's Downhill
 2022 Alpine Skiing World Cup – Men's Super-G
 2022 Alpine Skiing World Cup – Men's Slalom
 2022 Alpine Skiing World Cup – Men's Parallel
 World Cup scoring system

References

External links
 Alpine Skiing at FIS website

Men's giant slalom
FIS Alpine Ski World Cup men's giant slalom discipline titles